Backer Aloenouvo (born July 4, 1990 in Masséda) is a Togolese footballer, who currently plays for Togo club Arabia Tabligbo.

Career
Aloenouvo began his career in the youth from US Masséda, was in Summer 2007 promoted to the first team. He played at the 2008 CAF Confederations Cup against the Beninese side UNB.

On July 1, 2008, he joined to Tunisian club AS Marsa.

International career
Backer played with the U-17 from Togo at 2007 FIFA U-17 World Cup in South Korea.
He made his debut for the Senior Side on July 1, 2010 against Chad in which he scored. He also scored in a match against Malawi.

International goals

References

Togolese footballers
Togo international footballers
Togo youth international footballers
Expatriate footballers in Tunisia
1990 births
Living people
Togolese expatriate sportspeople in Tunisia
Togolese expatriates in Iraq
Expatriate footballers in Iraq
Al-Shorta SC players
AS Marsa players
ES Hammam-Sousse players
Stade Gabèsien players
Association football forwards
21st-century Togolese people